Borowe  (German Burau) is a village in the administrative district of Gmina Iłowa, within Żagań County, Lubusz Voivodeship, in western Poland.

The village has a population of 471.

References

Borowe